Thomas Martin (August 28, 1956 - February 4, 2023), is a former Olympic judoka.

He was a member of the 1976 and 1980 US Olympic Teams. The only Olympic Games he participated in was in Montreal. In 1975 he was selected to the Black Belt Magazine Hall of Fame.

References

Living people
American male judoka
Judoka at the 1976 Summer Olympics
Olympic judoka of the United States
1956 births